João Bosco Gualberto de Freitas, usually known as Biro-Biro (born June 23, 1974 in Caiçara do Norte, Rio Grande do Norte), is a retired professional Brazilian footballer who played as a midfielder for América-RN when the club was competing in Campeonato Brasileiro Série A in 1997 and in 1998.

Career
Biro-Biro played for América-RN from 1993 to 1999, helping his club finish as Campeonato Brasileiro Série B runner-up in 1996. He then played 45 Campeonato Brasileiro Série A matches for América-RN in 1997 and in 1998, and helped his club win the Campeonato do Nordeste in 1998, scoring one of the three club goals in the second leg of the final against Vitória of Bahia state. In 2003, he played for Flamengo-PI, moving to Atromitos of Greece in 2003, then Tisza Volán Szeged of Hungary in 2004, and Aek-Kranid of Greece in 2005, scoring ten goals in thirty matches for the latter club. In 2006, he retired while playing for River.

Honors
Biro-Biro won the following honors during his playing career

References

1964 births
Living people
Brazilian footballers
Brazilian expatriate footballers
América Futebol Clube (RN) players
Atromitos F.C. players
Expatriate footballers in Greece
Expatriate footballers in Hungary
Association football midfielders